Jesse Franklin Cleveland (October 25, 1804 – June 22, 1841) was a United States Representative and businessman from Georgia.

Cleveland was born in Greenville, South Carolina, in 1804. He attended school in South Carolina before moving to Georgia. From 1831 to 1843, Cleveland served in the Georgia Senate. In 1835, Cleveland was elected as a Jacksonian Representative from Georgia to the 24th United States Congress to complete the term left vacant when William Schley resigned to become Governor of Georgia. Cleveland was reelected to the 25th Congress and his congressional service spanned from October 5, 1835, until March 3, 1839.

After his congressional service, Cleveland moved to Charleston, South Carolina in 1839 and ran a business. He also served as a director of the Bank of South Carolina. Cleveland died on June 22, 1841, and was buried in cemetery of St. Michael's Church.

References

1804 births
1841 deaths
Democratic Party Georgia (U.S. state) state senators
Politicians from Greenville, South Carolina
Jacksonian members of the United States House of Representatives from Georgia (U.S. state)
Democratic Party members of the United States House of Representatives from Georgia (U.S. state)
19th-century American politicians